The World's End is an historic townhouse in Fraserburgh, Scotland, standing on Dalyrmple Street. Category B listed, it dates to around 1767.

The structure is two storeys and basement, constructed of squared heathen stone with freestone dressings and quoins. It has a shaped Dutch gable with an arched window and ball finials. Steps lead up to a pedimented door piece. A wooden porch present in the 1970s has since been removed.

The building's first known owner was Charles Gordon in 1766. It also once belonged to the Gordons of Glenbuchat (or Glenbucket). Alexander Forbes, 4th Lord Forbes of Pitsligo, hid here after the Battle of Culloden.

See also
 List of listed buildings in Fraserburgh, Aberdeenshire

References

1767 establishments in Scotland
Buildings and structures in Fraserburgh
Category B listed buildings in Aberdeenshire